William Thomas Paxton (August 3, 1869 – June 19, 1942) was an American Democratic politician who served as a member of the Virginia Senate from 1914 to 1916.

References

External links

1869 births
1942 deaths
Democratic Party Virginia state senators
20th-century American politicians
People from Rockbridge County, Virginia